Lomako may refer to:
 Lomako River, a river in Équateur province, Democratic Republic of the Congo
 Pyotr Lomako (1904–1990), Soviet politician and economist

See also